Jordan Bhekithemba Zemura (born 14 November 1999) is a professional footballer who plays as a left-back for Premier League club AFC Bournemouth. Born in England, Zemura represents the Zimbabwe national team.

Early life
Zemura went to the Oasis Academy Isle of Sheppey for secondary school and went on to study Sport Science at Canterbury University. He has also represented his county at athletics.

Club career

Early career
Zemura joined Queens Park Rangers' academy at the age of six, spending three years there. He had a brief trial with Chelsea, before moving to Charlton Athletic, where he spent eight years in their youth setup.

AFC Bournemouth
Zemura was signed by Bournemouth following a successful trial period in 2019. He made his debut for Bournemouth on 15 September 2020 in an EFL Cup tie against Crystal Palace at the Vitality Stadium, which Bournemouth won 11–10 on penalties after a 0–0 draw; Zemura scored his penalty in the shootout.

First team breakthrough
Zemura started in Bournemouth’s opening fixture against West Brom, his first league start for the club, with the game finishing 2–2. An impressive start to the 2021–22 season saw Zemura win the club’s Player of the Month award for August, starting all five league games in an unbeaten opening to the season for the Cherries. Zemura scored his first professional goals when he scored twice against Barnsley on 11 September 2021 in a 3–0 win.

International career
Despite being born in London, Zemura  represents Zimbabwe on the international stage as he holds Zimbabwean citizenship. Both of his parents were born in Zimbabwe, his father in Murehwa and his mother in Wedza.

He was called up to the Zimbabwe squad for the 2021 AFCON Qualifiers against Zambia and Botswana in November 2019 but was forced to withdraw due to an expired passport. He debuted for the Zimbabwe national team in a 3–1 2021 Africa Cup of Nations qualification loss to Algeria on 13 November 2020.

Zemura was named in the Zimbabwe squad for the 2021 Africa Cup of Nations.

Career statistics

Club

International

Honours
AFC Bournemouth
Championship runner-up: 2021–22

References

External links
Profile at the AFC Bournemouth website

1999 births
Living people
Footballers from Lambeth
People with acquired Zimbabwean citizenship
Zimbabwean footballers
English footballers
English people of Zimbabwean descent
Association football fullbacks
AFC Bournemouth players
English Football League players
Premier League players
Zimbabwe international footballers
2021 Africa Cup of Nations players